William Botting Hemsley (29 December 1843, in East Hoathly – 7 October 1924, in Kent) was an English botanist and 1909 Victoria Medal of Honour recipient.

He was born in East Hoathly, Sussex and in 1860 started work at the Royal Botanic Gardens, Kew as an Improver, then Assistant for India in the Herbarium, finally Keeper of Herbarium and Library. He wrote a number of botanical works.

In 1888, a genus of flowering plants from south-east Asia, belonging to the family Cucurbitaceae was named Hemsleya in his honour.

He was elected a Fellow of the Royal Society in June 1889.

Publications
 
 Biologica Centrali-Americana Botany. Vol. I , 1879–1888
 Biologica Centrali-Americana Botany. Vol. III, 1882–1886
 Botany of the Bermudas and various other Islands of the Atlantic and Southern Oceans, 1885
 Botany of Juan Fernandez, South-eastern Molluccas, and the Admiralty Islands, 1885
 An Enumeration of All the Plants Known from China Proper, Formosa, Hainan, Corea, the Luchu Archipelago, and the Island of Hong Kong. with Francis B. Forbes, 1887

Designation

References

External links
William Botting Hemsley finding aid collection held at Royal Botanic Gardens, Kew archives.

English botanists
Botanists active in China
1843 births
1924 deaths
People from East Hoathly
Fellows of the Royal Society
19th-century English people
19th-century British botanists